Causa Sui is a Danish instrumental psych-rock / stoner rock band composed of Jakob Skøtt, Jonas Munk, Rasmus Rasmussen and Jess Kahr. Beginning with their eponymous debut album, the band has released fourteen albums since 2005. Causa Sui's heavy sound is supplemented by abstract, instrumental and ambient styles akin to electric Miles Davis, or Can, particularly on their 'Sessions' series of albums, which feature guest musicians. Other cited influences include Popul Vuh, The Allman Brothers Band, Gabor Szabo, and Tame Impala. Despite seldom performing live, the band has released two live albums.

Band members

Jonas Munk - Guitars, Keyboards, Electronics, Vocals
Jess Kahr - Bass
Jakob Skøtt - Drums
Rasmus Rasmussen - Keyboards

Discography

Studio albums
 Causa Sui (2005)
 Free Ride (2007)
 Euporie Tide (2013)
 Return To Sky (2016)
 Vibraciones Doradas (2017)
 Szabodelico (2020)

Live albums
 Live at Freak Valley (2014)
 Live in Copenhagen (2017) - feat. Johan Riedenlow (sax) and Nicklas Sørensen (papir-guitar)

Sessions albums
 Summer Sessions - Vol 1 (2008) - feat. Johan Riedenlow (sax)
 Summer Sessions - Vol 2 (2009) - feat. Johan Riedenlow (sax)
 Summer Sessions - Vol 3 (2009) - feat. Johan Riedenlow (sax)
 Pewt'r Sessions 1 (2011) - feat. Ron Schneiderman
 Pewt'r Sessions 2 (2011) - feat. Ron Schneiderman
 Pewt'r Sessions 3 (2014) - feat. Ron Schneiderman

References 

Danish progressive rock groups
Danish rock music groups